Looc, officially the Municipality of Looc,  is a 5th class municipality in the province of Occidental Mindoro, Philippines. According to the 2020 census, it has a population of 7,802 people.

The municipality encompasses the eastern half of Lubang Island, as well as Ambil, Golo and some other minor islands. The municipality of Looc is part of the Lubang island group, which constitutes 7 islands which are geographically distinct from any landmasses, making the island group biologically unique - and endangered at the same time. The islands are under consideration to be set as a UNESCO tentative site due to its geographic importance, biological diversity, and intact rainforests.

Geography

Barangays

Looc is politically subdivided into 9 barangays.

 Agkawayan
 Ambil Tabao & Tambo
 Balikyas
 Bonbon (Poblacion)
 Bulacan
 Burol
 Guitna (Poblacion)
 Kanluran (Poblacion)
 Talaotao

Climate

Demographics

Economy

References

External links
Looc Profile at PhilAtlas.com
[ Philippine Standard Geographic Code]
Local Governance Performance Management System

Municipalities of Occidental Mindoro